Fermented tea (also known as post-fermented tea or dark tea) is a class of tea that has undergone microbial fermentation, from several months to many years. The exposure of the tea leaves to humidity and oxygen during the process also causes endo-oxidation (derived from the tea-leaf enzymes themselves) and exo-oxidation (which is microbially catalysed). The tea leaves and the liquor made from them become darker with oxidation. Thus, the various kinds of fermented teas produced across China are also referred to as dark tea, not be confused with black tea. The most famous fermented tea is  produced in Yunnan province.

The fermentation of tea leaves alters their chemistry, affecting the organoleptic qualities of the tea made from them. Fermentation affects the smell of the tea and typically mellows its taste, reducing astringency and bitterness while improving mouthfeel and aftertaste. The microbes may also produce metabolites with health benefits. Additionally, substances like ethyl carbamate (urethane) may be produced.

The fermentation is carried out primarily by molds. Aspergillus niger was implicated as the main microbial organism in the  process, but that species identification has been challenged by comprehensive PCR-DGGE analysis, which points to Aspergillus luchuensis as the primary agent of fermentation.

Most varieties of fermented teas are produced in China, its country of origin, with several varieties also produced in Korea and Japan. In Myanmar, lahpet is a form of fermented tea that is eaten as a vegetable, and similar pickled teas are also eaten or chewed in northern Thailand and southern Yunnan.

History
The early history of dark tea is unclear, but there are several legends and some credible theories.

For example, one legend holds that dark tea was first produced accidentally, on the Silk Road and Tea Road by tea caravans in the rainy season. When the tea was soaked in rain, the tea transporters abandoned it for fear of contamination. The next year, nearby villages suffered from dysentery, and decided to drink the abandoned mildewed tea in desperation. The legend concludes that the tea cured those suffering, and quickly became popular.

More historical accounts attribute the first production of dark tea to the Ming dynasty in the 15th and 16th centuries. It may have been first traded by tea merchants much earlier than the legends state, across the historical borders of Han and Tibetan cultural areas.

Varieties
Fermented teas can be divided according to how they are produced. Piled teas, such as the Chinese post-fermented teas, and the Toyama  produced in Japan, are fermented with naturally occurring fungus under relatively dry conditions. Other fermented teas, called pickled teas, are fermented in a wet process with lactic acid bacteria. A third category, including the Japanese  and Ishizuchi , is fermented with the piled and pickling methods successively.

China 

It is commonly pressed into bricks or cakes for ageing.

The most famous and important producing areas and varieties include:
 Anhui:  (Anhui Lu'an basket tea)
 Hubei:  (Hubei green brick tea)
 Hunan:  (, the famous   “brick tea”)
 Jingyang, Shaanxi:  (, the famous   “brick tea”)
 Sichuan:  (Sichuan border tea)
 Tibet:  (Tibetan tea, often called Tibetan brick tea)
 Yunnan:  (either "raw"   or "ripened"  )

Shapes include:
 Bamboo leaf logs
 Cakes, or 
 Bricks, or 
 Loose, in baskets
 Squares, or 

Japan 
Several distinct varieties of fermented tea are produced in Japan. Toyama prefecture's  is Japan's only piled tea, similar to the Chinese post-fermented teas. Toyama  is traditionally prepared by boiling in water, adding salt and stirring with a whisk as in a traditional tea ceremony. It is consumed on religious occasions or during meetings in the Asahi area of the prefecture.

Korea 

, also called , was the most commonly produced and consumed type of tea in pre-modern Korea.

Edible pickled tea 
Though the early history of tea is unclear, it has been established that for centuries people have chewed tea leaves. Few peoples today continue to consume tea by chewing or eating. 

In Northern Thailand, a pickled tea product called miang is chewed as a stimulant. Steamed tea leaves are kept pressed into sealed bamboo baskets until the anaerobic fermentation produces a compact cake with the desired flavor. The fermentation takes four to seven days for young leaves and about a year for mature leaves. Miang is related to the Thai and Lao street snack miang kham.

Pickled tea known as lahpet is widely consumed in Burmese cuisine, and plays an important role in Burmese ritual culture. After fermentation, the tea is eaten as a vegetable.

A similar pickled tea is eaten by the Blang people of Xishuangbanna in Yunnan, China, on the border with Myanmar and Laos.

Production
Many fermented teas do not arrive on the market ready for consumption. Instead, they may start as green teas or partially oxidized oolong-like teas, which are then allowed to slowly oxidize and undergo microbial fermentation over many years (comparable to wines that are sold to be aged in a cellar). Alternatively, fermented teas can be created quickly through a ripening process spanning several months, as with Shu Pu'er. This ripening is done through a controlled process similar to composting, where the moisture and temperature of the tea are carefully monitored. The product is "finished" fermented tea.

Fermented teas are commonly sold as compressed tea of various shapes, including bricks, discs, bowls, or mushrooms. Ripened  teas are ripened while loose, then compressed. Fermented teas can be aged for many years to improve their flavor, again comparable to wines. Raw  tea can be aged up to 50 years in some cases without diminishing in quality, and ripened  can be aged up to 10 or 15 years. Experts and aficionados disagree about the optimal age.

Many Tibetans and Central Asians use  or other fermented teas as a caloric and micronutrient food, boiled with yak butter, sugar and salt to make yak butter tea.

Ageing and storage
Post-fermented tea usually gets more valuable with age. Dark tea is often aged in bamboo baskets, bamboo-leaf coverings, or in its original packaging.

Many varieties of dark tea are purposely aged in humid environments to promote the growth of certain fungi, often called "golden flowers" or  because of the bright yellow color.

See also
 List of Chinese teas
 Kombucha a beverage produced by fermentation of brewed tea using a symbiotic culture of bacteria and yeast.

References

 
Chinese tea
Japanese tea
Korean tea